Gibbet Mill, Tillingham Mill, Barry's Mill or New Mill is a grade II listed cosmetically reconstructed smock mill at Rye, East Sussex, England. Today it serves as bed and breakfast accommodation.

History

A mill has stood on this site since 1596, and a post mill is known to have been built here in 1758. Gibbet Mill was built in 1824, the name Barry's mill coming from an early miller. The mill was working by wind until 1912, and was used as a bakery until 13 June 1930 when it was burnt down. The new mill was erected in 1932, Neve's of Heathfield being responsible for the millwrighting work.

Description

As built, Gibbett Mill was a four-storey smock mill on a single-storey brick base, with a stage at first-floor level. In 1844 she had four Patent sails but latterly was worked with four Spring sails. These were carried in a cast-iron Windshaft. The cap was in the Kentish style, winded by a fantail. The mill drove three pairs of millstones.

The replica mill bears very little resemblance to an actual working windmill. It has a shorter smock, making the mill appear squatter than the original. The cap is exaggerated in height and is not designed to turn into the wind. Replica sails and fantail are carried. The reconstructed stage is wider than the original.

Millers

Frederick Barry: 1824–1844
John Smith: 1848–1879
Gorge Standed: 1882–1899
Webb: 1917

References for above:-

References

External links

Windmill World Page on Gibbet windmill.
Rye Windmill B&B website.

Further reading
 Online version 

Smock mills in England
Grinding mills in the United Kingdom
Windmills completed in 1824
Industrial buildings completed in 1932
Grade II listed buildings in East Sussex
Windmills in East Sussex
Rye, East Sussex
Octagonal buildings in the United Kingdom